The Mandaean calendar is a 365-day solar calendar used by the Mandaean people. It consists of twelve 30-day months, with five extra days at the end of Šumbulta (the 8th month). The Parwanaya (or Panja) festival takes place during those five days. There is no leap year therefore every four years all Mandaean dates (like beginnings of the months or festivals) move one day back with respect to the Gregorian calendar.

Months
Each month is named after a constellation (manzalta). The Mandaic names of the 12 constellations of the Zodiac are derived from Aramaic common roots. As with the seven planets, overall the 12 constellations, frequently known as the trisar ("The Twelve") or trisar malwašia ("Twelve Constellations") in Mandaean scriptures, are generally not viewed favorably in Mandaeism, since they constitute part of the entourage of Ruha, the Queen of the World of Darkness who is also their mother.

Each month consists of exactly 30 days. The Parwanaya festival comes between the 8th month (Šumbulta) and 9th month (Qaina) to make up for 5 extra days in the solar calendar.

Due to a lack of a leap year included in the Mandaean calendar, dates change by one day every four years with respect to the Gregorian calendar. Currently, for example in 2022 CE, Sartana meaning Cancer corresponds to December / January in the Gregorian calendar instead of June / July.

Days and hours
The hours of the day are counted starting at dawn (ṣipra), although Mandaeans formerly counted the hours of the day starting at sunset or evening (paina). In Mandaic, a 24-hour day is known as a yuma, daytime as ʿumama, and nighttime as lilia.

Some days are considered to be auspicious, while others are ominous (mbaṭṭal).

The days of the week are as follows. Habšaba (Sunday) is considered to be the first day of the week.

Seasons
The four seasons are as follows, with the year starting with winter:
sitwa (winter)
abhar (spring)
giṭa (summer)
paiz (autumn)

Years
The Mandaean calendar is calculated from the year that Adam was born, or approximately 443,370 BCE. Charles G. Häberl calculates the date 18 July 2019 CE corresponds to 1 Dowla 481,343 AA (AA = after the creation of Adam).

All Mandaean years consist of exactly 365 days (12 regular months of 30 days each, plus the 5 intercalary days of the Parwanaya). Since Mandaean months do not have leap years accounted for every four years, seasons "slip back" and will not correspond to the same Gregorian months over time.

Epochs
According to Book 18 of the Right Ginza, there are four epochs (or eras) of the world, which is given a duration of 480,000 years.
Epoch of Adam and Hawa: 1st generation of humans (216,000 years; 30 generations according to Right Ginza Book 1)
Epoch of Ram and Rud: 2nd generation of humans (156,000 years; 25 generations according to Right Ginza Book 1)
Epoch of Šurbai and Šarhabʿil: 3rd generation of humans (100,000 years; 15 generations according to Right Ginza Book 1)
Epoch of Noah and his wife Nuraita/Nhuraita (current and final epoch): 4th generation of humans (remaining years, which would be 8,000 years if taking the 480,000 years into account)

Festivals
Mandaean festivals are:
Parwanaya: Five days that Hayyi Rabbi created the angels and the universe. The 5 epagomenals (extra days) inserted at the end of every Šumbulta (the 8th month) constitute the Parwanaya intercalary feast.
Dehwa Daimana or Dehwa Daymaneh (Dihba ḏ-Yamana, Dihba Daimana, or Dihba Rba ḏ-Daima): Birthday of John the Baptist. Children are baptized for the first time during this festival.
Kanshiy u-Zahly: New Year's Eve
Dehwa Rabba: New Year's Day
Dehwa d-Šišlam Rabba or Nauruz Zūṭa: Little New Year, on the 6th-7th days of Daula, corresponding to Epiphany in Christianity. The Night of Power takes place on the night of the 6th day (similar to Qadr Night), during which the heavenly gates of Abatur are open to the faithful. Priests visit Mandaean households and give them myrtle wreaths to hang on their houses for the rest of the year to protect against evil. The households also donate alms to the priests.
Dehwa Hanina or Dehwa Ṭurma (Dihba ḏ-Tirma): the Little Feast, begins on the 18th day of Taura. This holiday commemorates the ascension of Hibil Ziwa from the underworld to the Lightworld. The feast lasts for three days. On the first day, Mandaean families visit each other and have a special breakfast of rice, yogurt, and dates. Baptisms are performed, and the dead are commemorated with lofani (ritual meals).
Ead Fel: Crushed dates with roasted sesame seeds are eaten.
: Day of remembrance for the drowned people of Noah's flood. Grains and cereals are eaten. Mandaeans believe that on this day, Noah and his son Sam made the food of forgiveness of sins for the souls of those who died in the flood. The food of forgiveness consists of seven grains representing the seven days of the week, and from the grounding of these seven grains came the name Abu Al-Harees. (See Ashure or Noah's pudding.)

Example calendar
Below is an example of a calendar year for the Mandaean year 445375, which corresponds to the Gregorian calendar years 2005–2006 or Jewish calendar year 5766 (Gelbert 2005: 274). Fasting is practiced on some days.

Below are some Mandaean holiday dates for 2023:

March 16-20 – Parwanaya
May 20 – Dehwa Daymaneh
July 19 – Kanshiy u-Zahly
July 20-21 – Dehwa Rabba
November 2 – Dehwa Hanina
December 17 – Ashoriya (Abu Al Haris)

See also
 Assyrian calendar
 Babylonian calendar
 Iranian calendars
 Hebrew calendar
 Intercalary month (Egypt)

References

External links
Mandaean calendar from the Mandaean Synod of Australia

Mandaean calendar
Specific calendars
Calendar eras
Solar calendars
Liturgical calendar